Brodziński/ Brodzinski (feminine: Brodzińska/ Brodzinska, plural: Brodzińscy) is a Polish surname and may refer to:
 Anna Brodzińska, fashion designer
 Anne Brodzinsky, Zach Braff mother
 Bryce Brodzinski (born 2000), hockey player, drafted in 2019 NHL Entry Draft by Philadelphia Flyers
 Darryl J. Brodzinski, Undeniable: Live at Blues Alley executive producer
 Easton Brodzinski (born 1996), hockey player 
 Grażyna Brodzińska (born 1951), Polish soprano, opera and operetta singer, and musical actress
 Greg Brodzinski, Philadelphia Phillies bullpen catcher coach
 Irena Brodzińska, First female law students in Poland (upon their admittance to the University of Warsaw in 1915)
 Jonny Brodzinski (born 1993), hockey player
 Kazimierz Brodziński (1791–1835), Polish Romantic poet
  (1894–1942), Polish actor, writer, murdered in Auschwitz concentration camp
 Michael Brodzinski (born 1995), hockey player, drafted in 2013 NHL Entry Draft by San Jose Sharks
 Mike Brodzinski (born 1964), hockey player, father of Bryce, Easton, Jonny and Michael
 Witold Brodziński, Polish Reformed Church president consistory

See also
 
 Brudziński

Polish-language surnames